The Proto-Cuneiform script was used in Mesopotamia from roughly 3300 BC to 2900 BC. It arose from the token based system used in the region for the preceding millennia and was replaced by the development of early Cuneiform script in the Early Dynastic I period. While the underlying language of Cuneiform is definitively Sumerian, the language base for Proto-Cuneiform is as yet uncertain.

History

Beginning around the 9th millennium BC a token based system came into use in various parts of the ancient Near East. These evolved into marked tokens and later marked envelopes, often called clay bullae. It is usually assumed that these were the basis for the development of Proto-Cuneiform.

Proto-Cuneiform emerged in the Uruk IV period, circa 3300 BC and continued though the Uruk III times. The script slowly evolved over time with signs changing and merging. It was initially used in Uruk, later spreading to a few additional sites like Jemdet Nasr.

Finally, in the Early Dynastic I (c. 2900 BC) period the standard Cuneiform script, in the Sumerian language, emerged though only about 400 tablets have yet been recovered from this period, mainly from Ur with a few from Uruk.

Language

There is a longstanding debate in the academic community on when Sumerians came to Mesopotamia. This is partly driven by various linguistic arguments but also because a number of fundamental changes occurred in Mesopotamia, such as the plano-convex brick, at the same time as the Sumerian language definitively appeared in ED I. There are no clear clues in Proto-Cuneiform which has not prevented much speculation about the underlying language. Different languages have been proposed though often Sumerian is assumed.

Corpus

About 170 similar tablets from Uruk V (circa 3500 BC) Susa and a few other sites in Iran like Tepe Sialk are considered as pre-proto-Elamite though with similarities to Proto-Cuneiform. Sign lists and transliterations are less clear for this category.

The vast majority of Proto-Cuneiform texts have been found at Uruk, though in secondary contexts. Many had been used as fill for the foundation in the Eanna temple complex. The findspots and analysis of sealing has led to suggestions that the tablets originated elsewhere and ended up at Uruk, where they were discarded.

A smaller number of tablets were found in Jemdet Nasr, Khafajah and Tell Uqair. They tend to be less fragmentary and are sometimes found in stratified contexts. Some tablets have also made their way into various private and public collections. For example, in 1988 82 complete well-preserved tablets from the Swiss Erlenmeyer Collection in Basel were auctioned off with most ending up in public collections.

State of decipherment

Currently there are about 2000 known Proto-Cuneiform signs of which about 350 are numerical, 1100 are individual ideographic and 600 are complex (combination of 2 or more individual signs) signs.

Numbers

The underlying basis of the proto-cuneiform, like the later cuneiform, is sexagesimal (base 60). Earlier researchers believed that this system rose out of an earlier decimal (base 10) substratum but that idea has now lost currency.

Different products use different measurement systems and this can change with the context. In a single tablet the (Bisexagesimal System B) could be used for grain rations, (ŠE system Š) could be used for barley, and (ŠE system Š") be used for emmer wheat.

Text

The largest group of proto-cuneiform texts (about 2000 from the Uruk IV period and about 3600 from the Uruk III period) are accounts ie "economic records". They involve a variety of items including people, livestock, and grain. Unfortunately there are often multiple ways to do things. For example people can be listed two different ways 1) By gender and age (adult, minor, baby) or 2) without gender and in one of a number of age groups (0-1, 3-10 etc).

Another large category (around a dozen in Uruk IV and about 750 for Uruk III)) are called "lexical lists" started appearing in Uruk IV but became much more common in Uruk III times. These are list of all metals or a list of all tools or all cities etc. The genre persisted into Early Dynastic and Old Babylonian times.

Publication
The proto-cuneiform texts from Uruk were published in a series of books (ATU)

ATU 1. Adam Falkenstein, "Archaische Texte aus Uruk", Berlin und Leipzig: Deutsche Forschungsgemein-schaft, Kommissionsverlag Otto Harrassowitz. 1936.
ATU 2. M. W. Green und Hans J. Nissen, unter Mitarbeit von Peter Damerow und Robert K. Englund, "Zeichenliste der Archaischen Texte aus Uruk", Berlin 1987.
ATU 3. Robert K. Englund und Hans J. Nissen unter Mitarbeit von Peter Damerow, "Die Lexikalischen Listen der Archaischen Texte aus Uruk", Berlin 1993.
ATU 4. Robert K. Englund und Hans J. Nissen, "Katalog der Archaischen Texte aus Uruk"
ATU 5.  Robert K. Englund unter Mitarbeit von R. M. Boehmer, "Archaic Administrative Texts from Uruk: The Early Campaigns", Berlin: Gebr. Mann Verlag 1994
ATU 6. Robert K. Englund und Hans J. Nissen unter Mitarbeit von R. M. Boehmer, "Archaische Verwaltungstexte aus Uruk: Vorderasiatisches Museum II", Berlin 2005.
ATU 7. Robert K. Englund und Hans J. Nissen unter Mitarbeit von R. M. Boehmer, "Archaische Verwaltungstexte aus Uruk: Die Heidelberger Sammlung", Berlin 2001.

And from other sites (MSVO)

MSVO 1. Robert K. Englund, Jean-Pierre Grégoire, and Roger J. Matthews, The Proto-Cuneiform Texts from Jemdet  Nasr I: Copies, Transliterations and Glossary. Materialien zu den  frühen Schriftzeugnissen des Vorderen Orients Bd. 1. Berlin: Gebr. Mann, 1991
MSVO 2. Matthews, R. J. Cities,  Seals  and  Writing:  Archaic  Seal  Impressions  from  Jemdet  Nasr  and  Ur. Berlin: Gebr. Mann 1993
MSVO 3. Damerow, P. & Englund, R. K. forthcoming. The Proto-Cuneiform Texts from the Erlenmeyer Collection. Berlin.
MSVO 4. Robert K. Englund and Roger J. Matthews, Proto-Cuneiform Textsfrom Diverse Collections. Materialien zu den frühen Schriftzeugnissen des Vorderen Orients Bd. 4. Berlin: Gebr. Mann, 1996

Gallery

See also
Proto-Elamite
Blau Monuments

References

External links
Full list of Proto-Cuneiform Signs from CDLI
Proto-Cuneiform article at CDLI
Tablet from the Erlenmeyer Collection purchased by the British Museum
DIscussion of Proto-Cuneiform Lexical Lists at UPenn Museum
Uruk IV tablet - photos and transliterations - CDLI
Uruk III tablets - pictures and transliterations - CDLI

Further reading
 Born, Logan, and Kathryn Kelley. "A Quantitative Analysis of Proto-Cuneiform Sign Use in Archaic Tribute." Cuneiform Digital Library Bulletin, 2021
Charvát, Petr, "On  People,  Signs  and  States  –  Spotlights  on  Sumerian  Society,  c.  3500–2500  B.C.", Prague: The Oriental Institute, Academy of  Sciences of  the Czech Republic, 1998
 Charvát, Petr. "Cherchez la femme: The SAL Sign in Proto-Cuneiform Writing". La famille dans le Proche-Orient ancien: réalités, symbolismes et images: Proceedings of the 55e Rencontre Assyriologique Internationale, Paris, edited by Lionel Marti, University Park, USA: Penn State University Press, pp. 169-182, 2021
 Diaco, Maddalena. "The Signs For Buildings in the Proto-Cuneiform." Rivista di Preistoria e Protostoria delle Civiltà Antiche Review of prehistory and protohistory of ancient civilizations 43, pp. 35-52, 2020
 Englund, Robert K. "Proto-cuneiform account-books and journals." Creating Economic Order: Recordkeeping, Standardization and the Development of Accounting in the Ancient Near East , Michael Hudson and Cornelia Wunsch [eds.], Bethesda, Maryland: CDL Press, pp. 23-46, 2004
 Englund, Robert K. "Late Uruk period cattle and dairy products: Evidence from proto-cuneiform sources." Bulletin of Sumerian Agriculture 8.2, pp. 33-48, 1995
Englund, Robert K., "The Smell of  the Cage", in Cuneiform Digital Library Journal 2009:4, 2009 
Englund, Robert K, "Late Uruk Pigs and Other Herded Animals", in: U. Finkbeiner, R. Dittmann and H. Hauptmann, eds., Festschrift Boehmer Mainz pp. 121-133 , 1995
 Glassner, J-J. "Proto-Cuneiform Texts from Diverse Collections." The Journal of the American Oriental Society 119.3, pp. 547-547, 1999
 Kelley, Kathryn. Gender, age, and labour organization in the earliest texts from Mesopotamia and Iran (c. 3300-2900 BC). Diss. University of Oxford, 2018.
 Langdon, Stephen Herbert, "Pictographic Inscriptions from Jemdet Nasr excavated by the Oxford and Field Museum Expedition", Oxford editions of cuneiform texts 7, Oxford University Press, 1928
 Nissen, Hans-Jörg. "Uruk: Early Administration Practices and the Development of Proto-Cuneiform Writing." Archéo-Nil 26.1, pp. 33-48, 2016
 Nissen, HansJörg; Damerow, Peter; Englund, Robert K., "Archaic Bookkeeping: Early Writing and Techniques of Economic Administration in the Ancient Near East.", Chicago: University of Chicago Press, 1993
Wagensonner, Klaus. "Early Lexical Lists and Their Impact on Economic Records: An Attempt of Correlation Between Two Seemingly Different Kinds of Data-Sets". Organization, Representation, and Symbols of Power in the Ancient Near East: Proceedings of the 54th Rencontre Assyriologique Internationale at Würzburg 20–25 Jul, edited by Gernot Wilhelm, University Park, USA: Penn State University Press, pp. 805-818, 2022

Obsolete writing systems
Cuneiform
Sumerian language